Aphyllotus is a fungal genus in the family Marasmiaceae. This is a monotypic genus, containing the single species Aphyllotus campanelliformis, found in Colombia. Both the species and the genus were described by mycologist Rolf Singer in 1973.

See also
 List of Agaricales genera
 List of Marasmiaceae genera

References

 

Marasmiaceae
Monotypic Agaricales genera
Fungi of Colombia
Fungi described in 1973
Taxa named by Rolf Singer